Ramón Pereyra Jacinto (born June 3, 1945), best known by his initials RJ, is a Filipino businessman, musician and radio TV personality. He previously served as Undersecretary for Government Digital Broadcast Television and the Digitization of the Entertainment Industry Sector in Department of Information and Communications Technology. He is also the founder and chairman of Philippine rock-and-roll radio station DZRJ and the Rajah Broadcasting Network.

Education
Jacinto attended the Ateneo de Manila University and graduated with honors in Economics. To further his studies, he took up law at the University of Santo Tomas while working for his father's steel company, Iligan Integrated Steel Mills, Inc.

Career
Jacinto became an entrepreneur at the age of 15, founding the first multi-track recording company in Asia. At the age of 17, Jacinto and his friends established his radio station in his parents' backyard. The establishment of the radio station with the call letters dzRJ, would eventually become the legendary and at the same time, influential rock and roll station in the country.

By the age of 19, Jacinto began working at his family's Iligan Integrated Steel Mills, Inc. (IISMI), the Philippines' largest steel mill, as VP Purchasing and later as SVP Operations. His band RJ and the Riots disbanded in 1971.

During the Martial law period under Ferdinand Marcos, the Jacinto family's assets were forcibly seized and placed under military control and executives of the company were jailed with no charges filed. The sequestered assets included Jacinto's two radio stations. At that time, Jacinto was in the United States and opted to stay there in exile for 14 years to save himself from being jailed. During his exile, Jacinto recorded songs together with other Filipino musicians and secretly sent them to the Philippines for airplay. The songs "Muli" and "Don't Let Go" became hits but the composers and singers were not named in order to avoid military sanctions.

On March 5, 1986, Juan Ponce Enrile, who was then the Defense Minister, returned the radio stations and some of the Jacinto family's steel mills back to the Jacintos. DZRJ was finally transferred from military administration in June 1986 and Jacinto began to make DZRJ, the leader in retro wave by playing music from the 1950s, 1960s and 1970s.

Upon returning from exile from Martial Law, Jacinto established a string of businesses:

UHF Television 
Home TV Shopping
Non-collateral Consumer Finance 
American Style Bargain Stores like Price Club (now occupied by S&R Shopping), Save-A-Lot & Cotsco

He also owned Ventures Rural Bank, which he later sold and is now known as AMA Bank.

Through his show RJ Sunday Jam, he is claimed to be the first to establish "teleradyo" - a simulcast of radio on TV which was the model for ABS-CBN's DZMM TeleRadyo, the #1 AM radio station in the country.

Bistro RJ, RJ Bar and RJ Bistro
On July 25, 1986, Jacinto set up Bistro RJ, a rock and roll music lounge and restaurant located at Arnaiz Avenue, Makati, Metro Manila which became popular for those who were into singing and dancing. At the time, live bands traveled abroad to make a living and the night circuit in Manila depended on piano bars and discos. Jacinto decided to hire live bands to provide financial opportunities as well as to revive the night life in the Philippines through live music.

Bistro RJ was renamed RJ Bar in 1991. It relocated to the Mandarin Oriental Manila Hotel in 1997 and later to Gil Puyat Avenue and subsequently Jupiter Street, all in Makati, Metro Manila.

In 2010, RJ Bar was renamed RJ Bistro and relocated to the Dusit Thani Hotel Manila in Makati, Metro Manila. and in December 10 of the Same Year, RJ Bistro was re-opened at the Lower Level of Dusit Thani Hotel in Makati, Metro Manila.

RJ Guitars
Jacinto developed an interest in music and he was particularly inclined to the guitar. RJ Guitars Store was launched in 1988 in Glorietta Mall (formerly Quad Mall), Makati. While performing in his bistro, Jacinto felt exasperated about switching between a Fender Jazzmaster and a Gibson Les Paul. He decided to approach the legendary Filipino luthier Rudy Discipulo to make a guitar versatile enough to produce all the sounds he needed. Impressed by Discipulo's workmanship, Jacinto embarked on putting up a guitar manufacturing business. At present, there are 20 RJ Guitar Centers in the Philippines, providing RJ Guitar models, and other musical instruments as well as distributing Taylor Guitars and other brands from abroad.

In 2017, he established RJ Bacchus Japanese Guitar Factory, in partnership with Japanese guitar manufacturer Deviser. The 1,150 square meter factory located in Dasmariñas, Cavite.

RJ Academy of Music
The RJ Academy of Music began in 1994 when RJ Guitar Center became the licensee of the Music Institute of Los Angeles, California.

Presidential appointments
Jacinto served as Vice Chairman for the Presidential Committee on Flagship Programs and Projects under former President Fidel V. Ramos from March 22, 1995 to March 1, 1998.

Since 2008, Jacinto is president and CEO of Philcomsat Holdings Corporation, a subsidiary of Philippine Communications Satellite Corporation (PHILCOMSAT). He is also Chairman of the Board of Directors and Chairman of the Executive Committee of PHILCOMSAT.

On July 14, 2016, President Rodrigo Duterte appointed Jacinto as Presidential Adviser on Economic Affairs and Information Technology Communications with the rank of Undersecretary. During the 2016 presidential campaign of Duterte, Jacinto was among the celebrities who were actively supporting him. He created a campaign jingle for Duterte during his 2016 presidential campaign.

On May 22, 2020, Jacinto was appointed Undersecretary for Government Digital Broadcast Television and the Digitization of the Entertainment Industry Sector Department of Information and Communications Technology.

On November 25, 2020, Jacinto was again appointed by President Duterte as his Presidential Adviser for Telecommunications with the rank of Secretary.

Presidential citation
On June 23, 1998, Jacinto was awarded a Presidential Citation in recognition of the distinguished and exemplary service he rendered to the Philippines as presidential consultant of President Fidel V. Ramos from March 22, 1995 to March 1, 1998.

Personal life
Jacinto is married to Frannie Osorio Aguinaldo. He was previously married to María Lourdes "Marilou" Tuason Arroyo.

Discography

RJ & the Riots
1962: The Teenage Touch of RJ & the Riots  Dance with the Guitarman, Just for Tonight, Dahil Sa Yo, La Bamba, Patricia, Weightless, Too Much Masi-Mashi, Hungry Eye, Turkish Town, Five-Foot Too, Mandrake, I'm in the Mood for Love.
1964: RJ & the Riots

Solo albums
1987: Back from Exile
1990: The Guitarman
1991: Giliw
1992: The Guitarman II
2014: Fine as Wine Instrumentals
2015: RJ Orig
2016: Swinging the Kundiman
2016: Romancing RJ
2017: Songs I Grew Up With
2019: Kundiman Ni Guitarman
2020: KundiRock
2023: Bouncing the Standards

Extended plays
1992: Compact Series

Live albums
1992: Live Adventures of RJ Vol. 1
2007: RJ Symphonic Rock

Christmas albums
1989: Pasko Na Naman
1990: Christmas with RJ
2015: Super Vintage Christmas Guitar Instrumentals

Collaborative albums
2012: RJ Duets

Compilations and other albums
1991: RJ Best of Original Hits
1999: The Ultimate RJ Bistro Collection Vol. 1
2000: The Ultimate RJ Bistro Collection Vol. 2
2005: The Very Best of RJ
2005: Rock & Roll Classics
2006: Muli

Collaborations
1994: Quantum Hit Series Vol. 1 (RJ Productions, formerly Quantum Music Corporation)
1994: Quantum Hit Series Vol. 2 (RJ Productions, formerly Quantum Music Corporation)
1996: Quantum Hit Series Vol. 4 (RJ Productions, formerly Quantum Music Corporation)

References

External links
"Philippine radio's top innovators honored." Inquirer, 1 January 2000
"Who's Who of the Philippines". Philippine Tatler. 2009.
Biography at Rjplanet.com
"One iconic night with Ramon 'RJ' Jacinto and the sultans of Pinoy Rock." Inquirer, 7 June 2015

1945 births
Living people
Ateneo de Manila University alumni
Businesspeople from Metro Manila
20th-century Filipino businesspeople
Filipino rock musicians
Filipino radio personalities
Musicians from Metro Manila
Duterte administration personnel
People from Pasay
University of Santo Tomas alumni
21st-century Filipino businesspeople